The American Statistical Association (ASA) is the main professional organization for statisticians and related professionals in the United States. It was founded in Boston, Massachusetts on November 27, 1839, and is the second oldest continuously operating professional society in the US (only the Massachusetts Medical Society, founded in 1781, is older). The ASA services statisticians, quantitative scientists, and users of statistics across many academic areas and applications. The association publishes a variety of journals and sponsors several international conferences every year.

Mission
The organization's mission is to promote good application of statistical science, specifically to:
 support excellence in statistical practice, research, journals, and meetings
 work for the improvement of statistical education at all levels
 promote the proper application of statistics
 anticipate and meet member needs
 use the discipline of statistics to enhance human welfare
 seek opportunities to advance the statistics profession

Membership
As of 2022, the ASA membership exceeds 19,000 professionals found in government, academia, and the private sector.

Fellowship

New Fellowships of the ASA are granted annually by the ASA Committee on Fellows. Candidates must have been members for the preceding three years but may be nominated by anyone. The maximum number of recipients each year is one-third of one percent of the ASA membership.

Organizational structure
ASA is organized in Sections, Chapters and Committees. Chapters are arranged geographically, representing 78 areas across the US and Canada. An example of an early and large chapter is the SoCalASA.  Sections are subject-area and industry-area interest groups covering 22 sub-disciplines. ASA has more than 60 committees coordinating meetings, publications, education, careers, and special-interest topics involving statisticians.

Accredited Professional Statistician
, the ASA offers the Accredited Professional Statistician status (PStat), to members who meet the ASA's credentialing requirements, which include an advanced degree in statistics or related quantitative field, five years of documented experience, and evidence of professional competence. A list of current members with PStat status is available.

The ASA also offers the Graduate Statistician status (GStat) as of April 2014. It serves as a preparatory accreditation suitable for graduate students.

Publications

The ASA publishes several scientific journals:
Journal of the American Statistical Association (JASA)
The American Statistician (TAS)
Journal of Business & Economic Statistics (JBES)
Journal of Agricultural, Biological and Environmental Statistics (JABES)
Journal of Computational and Graphical Statistics (JCGS)
Technometrics (TECH)

Online-only journals:
Journal of Statistics Education (JSE)
Journal of Statistical Software (JSS)

The ASA co-sponsors the Current Index to Statistics (CIS)

Quarterly magazine: Chance

The monthly magazine for members Amstat News is available online.

Historical publications include:
 Edward Jarvis, William Brigham and John Wingate Thornton, Memorial of the American Statistical Association Praying the Adoption of Measures for the Correction of Errors in the Census, 1844
 Publications of the American Statistical Association, 1888-1919 (Vols. 1-16) and Quarterly Publications of the American Statistical Association, 1920-1921

Meetings
Meetings provide a platform for scholars and practitioners to exchange research, job opportunities and ideas with each other. ASA holds an annual meeting called Joint Statistical Meetings (JSM), a conference on statistical methodologies and applications called Spring Research Conference (SRC), Conference on Statistical Practice (CSP), and sponsors multiple international meetings and special-interest group meetings.

See also

American Mathematical Society
COPSS Presidents' Award
Fellows of the American Statistical Association
President of the American Statistical Association
Statistics Without Borders (SWB)

References

External links
 American Statistical Association

 
Professional associations based in the United States
Statistical organizations in the United States
1839 establishments in the United States